This is a list of pages listing accidents and incidents involving the Douglas DC-3, including aircraft based on the DC-3 airframe such as the Douglas C-47 Skytrain and Lisunov Li-2. Military accidents are included; and hijackings and incidents of terrorism are covered, although acts of war are outside the scope of this list.

1930s
List of accidents and incidents involving the DC-3 in the 1930s

1940s
1940List of accidents and incidents involving the DC-3 in 1940
1941List of accidents and incidents involving the DC-3 in 1941
1942List of accidents and incidents involving the DC-3 in 1942
1943List of accidents and incidents involving the DC-3 in 1943
1944List of accidents and incidents involving the DC-3 in 1944
1945List of accidents and incidents involving the DC-3 in 1945
1946List of accidents and incidents involving the DC-3 in 1946
1947List of accidents and incidents involving the DC-3 in 1947
1948List of accidents and incidents involving the DC-3 in 1948
1949List of accidents and incidents involving the DC-3 in 1949

1950s
1950List of accidents and incidents involving the DC-3 in 1950
1951List of accidents and incidents involving the DC-3 in 1951
1952List of accidents and incidents involving the DC-3 in 1952
1953List of accidents and incidents involving the DC-3 in 1953
1954List of accidents and incidents involving the DC-3 in 1954
1955List of accidents and incidents involving the DC-3 in 1955
1956List of accidents and incidents involving the DC-3 in 1956
1957List of accidents and incidents involving the DC-3 in 1957  1957 Cebu Douglas C-47 crash which caused the death of the 7th President of the Philippines, Ramon Magsaysay
1958List of accidents and incidents involving the DC-3 in 1958
1959List of accidents and incidents involving the DC-3 in 1959

1960s
1960List of accidents and incidents involving the DC-3 in 1960
1961List of accidents and incidents involving the DC-3 in 1961
1962List of accidents and incidents involving the DC-3 in 1962
1963List of accidents and incidents involving the DC-3 in 1963
1964List of accidents and incidents involving the DC-3 in 1964
1965List of accidents and incidents involving the DC-3 in 1965
1966List of accidents and incidents involving the DC-3 in 1966
1967List of accidents and incidents involving the DC-3 in 1967
1968List of accidents and incidents involving the DC-3 in 1968
1969List of accidents and incidents involving the DC-3 in 1969

1970s
List of accidents and incidents involving the DC-3 (1970–1974)
List of accidents and incidents involving the DC-3 (1975–1979)

1980s
List of accidents and incidents involving the DC-3 in the 1980s

1990s	
List of accidents and incidents involving the DC-3 in the 1990s

Since 2000	
List of accidents and incidents involving the DC-3 since 2000

Notes
 Military versions of the DC-3 were known as C-47 Skytrain, C-48, C-49, C-50, C-51, C-52, C-53 Skytrooper, C-68, C-84, C-117 Super Dakota and YC-129 by the United States Army Air Forces and its successor the United States Air Force; and as the R4D by the United States Navy. In Royal Air Force (and other British Commonwealth air forces') service, these aircraft were known as Dakotas.

Lists of aviation accidents and incidents
Accidents and incidents involving airliners